is a Japanese businessman, former president and chief executive officer (CEO) of Nippon Telegraph and Telephone (NTT), the third largest telecommunications company in the world in terms of revenue.

Hiroo Unoura was born on 13 January 1949. In 1973, he obtained a BA degree in Law from the University of Tokyo.

Unoura joined NTT in April 1973, and has held various senior positions at NTT. He became president and CEO in June 2012. In June 2018, he was succeeded as CEO by Jun Sawada.

References

Living people
1949 births
Japanese chief executives
University of Tokyo alumni